Lakeport is an unincorporated community in Glades County, Florida, United States, located near the western shore of Lake Okeechobee, off State Road 78. It is just south of the Brighton Seminole Indian Reservation.

Geography
Lakeport is located at  (26.9761, -81.1275).

References

Unincorporated communities in Glades County, Florida
Unincorporated communities in Florida
Populated places on Lake Okeechobee